Jacek Grembocki (born 10 May 1965) is a Polish former football player and manager. Besides Poland, he has played in Venezuela and Germany.

He began his career with Lechia Gdańsk and also debuted as senior there. In 1983, Lechia won the Polish Cup as a team from the 3rd division and Grembocki was part of the team.

Grembocki joined Gornik Zabrze in 1986 and played for 9 seasons winning the Polish title in 1987 and 1988. He also played for Petrochemia Płock and for a few clubs in Venezuela and Germany.

He debuted for Poland on 18 March 1987 against Finland. His last international match was in 1994.

In 1992, Chelsea sent an inquiry to Gornik Zabrze, however the transfer was never finalized.

On 21 April 2009 Grembocki joined Polonia Warsaw as the manager.

Honours

Górnik Zabrze
 Ekstraklasa (2): 1986/87; 1987/88
 Polish SuperCup: 1988

Lechia Gdańsk
 Polish Cup: 1982/83
 Polish SuperCup: 1983

References

External links 
 
 Manager Profile

Sportspeople from Gdańsk
1965 births
Living people
Polish footballers
Poland international footballers
Lechia Gdańsk players
Górnik Zabrze players
Wisła Płock players
Caracas FC players
FSV Frankfurt players
VfL Osnabrück players
Elana Toruń players
Polish football managers
Znicz Pruszków managers
Polonia Warsaw managers
Association football defenders